Nail Elmastaşoğlu (born 1 January 1933) is a Turkish former professional footballer. Elmastaşoğlu's brothers, Ayhan and Ayfer, were also professional footballers.

References

External links
Mackolik Profile

1933 births
Living people
Sportspeople from İzmir
Turkish footballers
Association football forwards
Altay S.K. footballers
Altınordu F.K. players